Patrick Anthony Lundy (May 21, 1924 – November 23, 1999) was a Canadian professional ice hockey forward who played 150 games in the National Hockey League for the Chicago Black Hawks and Detroit Red Wings between 1946 and 1951. The rest of his career, which lasted from 1943 to 1962, was spent in various minor leagues.

Playing career
Born in Saskatoon, Saskatchewan, Lundy played for the Regina Capitals of the WCSHL, the Indianapolis Capitals and the St. Louis Flyers of the AHL, the Milwaukee Sea Gulls of the USHL, the Regina Capitals of the SSHL and the Calgary Stampeders and the Brandon Regals of the WHL.

Career statistics

Regular season and playoffs

External links
 

1924 births
1999 deaths
Brandon Regals players
Calgary Stampeders (WHL) players
Canadian ice hockey centres
Chicago Blackhawks players
Detroit Red Wings players
Ice hockey people from Saskatchewan
Indianapolis Capitals players
St. Louis Flyers players
Sportspeople from Saskatoon